José Delbo (born December 9, 1933) is an Argentine comics artist. He is best known for his work on Wonder Woman for DC Comics and The Transformers for Marvel Comics.

Career
José Delbo became a professional comics artist at the age of 16 working for the Argentine Poncho Negro series. Due to political instability in Argentina, he moved to Brazil in 1963 and then to the United States two years later. His early work for the U.S. market included Billy the Kid for Charlton Comics. He drew many TV tie-in comic books for Dell Comics and Western Publishing's Gold Key Comics including The Brady Bunch, Hogan's Heroes, The Mod Squad, The Monkees, and The Twilight Zone. A comics biography of Dwight D. Eisenhower drawn by Delbo was published by Dell in 1969 soon after the former President's death. Delbo named The Monkees, The Lone Ranger, and an adaptation of the Yellow Submarine film as being among his favorite projects.

His first work for DC Comics appeared in The Spectre #10 (May–June 1969). Delbo became the artist on the Wonder Woman title with issue #222 (Feb.–March 1976) and drew the series until #286 (Dec. 1981). Following the popularity of the Wonder Woman television series (initially set during World War II), Delbo and writer Martin Pasko transposed the comic book series to this era. A few months after the TV series changed its setting to the 1970s, Delbo and Jack C. Harris returned the comic book to the contemporary timeline. Soon after, Wonder Woman's longtime love interest Steve Trevor was killed but writer Gerry Conway and Delbo brought the character back to life again in issue #271 (Sept. 1980). The Lumberjack, a character created by Delbo and Conway in Wonder Woman #268 (June 1980) appeared on the Supergirl television series in 2015. Conway and Delbo introduced a new version of the Cheetah in issue #274 (Dec. 1980).

Delbo's other work for DC includes the Batman Family, three stories for the "Whatever Happened to...?" backup feature in DC Comics Presents, the Jimmy Olsen feature in The Superman Family, and the Batgirl feature in Detective Comics. His final major work for DC was a brief run on the Superman/Batman feature in World's Finest Comics in 1985.

In 1986, Delbo began working for Marvel Comics where he drew ThunderCats, The Transformers, and NFL SuperPro. He co-created Brute Force with Simon Furman in 1990.

Delbo taught at The Kubert School from the 1990s until 2005. After moving to Florida, he taught at a "cartoon camp" program for school-aged children in Boca Raton.

Awards
Delbo received an Inkpot Award at the San Diego Comic-Con International in 2013.

Bibliography

Charlton Comics

 Billy the Kid #57–69, 71–110 (1966–1974)
 Black Fury #57 (1966)
 Geronimo Jones #1–9 (1971–1973)
 Ghostly Tales #77 (1969)
 Gunmaster #89 (1967)
 Just Married #105 (1975)
 The Many Ghosts of Doctor Graves #24, 38 (1971–1973)
 Outlaws of the West #57 (1966)
 Scary Tales #44 (1984)
 Wyatt Earp Frontier Marshal #62 (1966)

DC Comics

 Action Comics #453–454 (Atom backup feature) (1975)  
 Adventure Comics #417–418 (Supergirl); #464 (Wonder Woman) (1972–1979) 
 The Adventures of Ford Fairlane #1–2 (1990)  
 Batman Family #4 (Robin); #6, 12 (Batgirl) (1975–1977)  
 DC Comics Presents #26 ("Whatever Happened to Sargon the Sorcerer?"); #42 ("Whatever Happened to the Sandman?"); #47 ("Whatever Happened to Sandy the Golden Boy?") (1980–1982)  
 DC Special Series #9, 19 (Wonder Woman) (1978–1979)  
 Detective Comics #488–489, 491, 493–499, 501–502, 504–506, 508–510, 512–517 (Batgirl) (1980–1982)  
 Forbidden Tales of Dark Mansion #6 (1972)  
 Fury of Firestorm #57 (1987)  
 Ghosts #38, 55 (1975–1977) 
 Green Lantern #169 (1983)  
 House of Mystery #210 (1973)  
 House of Secrets #97 (1972)  
 Isis #3 (1977)  
 Mystery in Space #116 (1981)
 New Adventures of Superboy #14, 26–27 (1981–1982)  
 Rainbow Brite and the Star Stealer #1 (1986)
 The Spectre #10 (1969)
 Superman #356 ("World of Krypton" backup story) (1981) 
 The Superman Family #181–182 (Lois Lane); #184–185 (Supergirl); #207, 210–222 (Jimmy Olsen) (1976–1982) 
 Superman's Pal Jimmy Olsen #149–151 (1972)  
 Tales of the Teen Titans #66 (M.A.S.K. insert story) (1986)  
 Teen Titans #48–49 (1977)  
 The Unexpected #158 (1974)  
 Unknown Soldier #262–264 (Tomahawk backup feature) (1982)  
 Who's Who: The Definitive Directory of the DC Universe #1, 7, 13, 17 (1985–1986)
 The Witching Hour #2, 4, 6, 9, 13, 66 (1969–1976)  
 Wonder Woman #222–223, 225–230, 235–240, 242–286 (1976–1981)  
 World's Finest Comics #244, 247 (Wonder Woman); #256 (Black Canary); #257–258 (Green Arrow); #263–264 (Aquaman); #265–270, 272 (Red Tornado); #318–321, 323 (Superman/Batman) (1977–1986)

Dell Comics

 The Big Valley #4 (1967)
 The Brady Bunch #1–2 (1970)
 Dwight D. Eisenhower #01-237-912 (1969)
 Flying Saucers #1, 5 (1967–1969)
 Gentle Ben #2–3 (1968)
 Hogan's Heroes #5 (1967)
 The Mod Squad #1–8 (1969–1971)
 The Monkees #2–16 (1967–1968)
 Nanny and the Professor #1–2 (1970)
 The Rat Patrol #3–5 (1967)
 The Young Lawyers #1–2 (1971)
 The Young Rebels #1 (1971)

Gold Key Comics

 Boris Karloff Tales of Mystery #34, 36, 45–48, 50–51, 53, 55, 57, 59–60, 62, 64, 97 (1971–1980)
 Buck Rogers Giant Movie Edition #11296 (1979)
 Buck Rogers in the 25th Century #4 (1979)
 Doctor Solar, Man of the Atom #27–28 (1969–1981)
 Grimm's Ghost Stories #19, 21–23, 31, 49, 60 (1974–1982)
 Judge Colt #2–4 (1970)
 Lone Ranger #22 (1975)
 Mighty Samson #23–28 (1974–1975)
 Mystery Comics Digest #12, 16, 22, 25 (1973–1975)
 Questar #1 (1979)
 Ripley's Believe It or Not! #14, 20, 22–23, 25, 35, 45, 47, 50–51, 53–54, 57, 61, 90 (1969–1979)
 Ripley's Believe It or Not! True Ghost Stories #2 (1979)
 Shadow Play #1 (1982)
 Starstream #2, 4 (1976)
 Turok, Son of Stone #79, 81, 96–99, 101–102, 104, 114, 127 (1972–1981)
 The Twilight Zone #16, 31, 52, 58–59, 61, 63, 65–66, 76, 82 (1966–1978)
 Voyage to the Bottom of the Sea #15 (1969)
 Yellow Submarine #1 (1968)

Marvel Comics

 Barbie #34 (1993) 
 Brute Force #1–4 (1990) 
 Captain Planet and the Planeteers #1–2 (1991)
 Conan the Barbarian #226–227 (1989)
 Disney Comic Hits #16 ("101 Dalmatians") (1997)  
 Inhumanoids #3 (1987)  
 Marvel Comics Presents #45, 68 (1990–1991)  
 NFL SuperPro #1–7 (1991–1992)  
 NFL SuperPro Super Bowl Special #1 (1991)  
 Ravage 2099 #9 (1993)  
 ThunderCats #7–13, 15, 17, 22 (1986–1988)  
 The Transformers #36–42, 45–54, 56–60, 63–64, 67 (1988–1990)

Tower Comics
 Fight the Enemy #1, 3 (1966–1967)

Valiant Comics
 Armorines #8, 10–12 (1995)  
 Shadowman #7 (1992)  
 X-O Manowar #16 (1993)

References

External links
 

 DC Profile #76: José Delbo at the Grand Comics Database 
 José Delbo at Mike's Amazing World of Comics
 José Delbo at the Unofficial Handbook of Marvel Comics Creators
 SDCC 2013 Coverage: José Delbo panel at YouTube
 

1933 births
Argentine comics artists
Argentine emigrants to the United States
Art educators
Inkpot Award winners
Living people
Silver Age comics creators
Disney comics artists
Prêmio Angelo Agostini winners